Swami Vishwadevanand Puri (born 26 January 1946) is a Hindu monk and traditional teacher of Advaita Vedanta. He is also founder of the Vishwakalyan Foundation Trust. (Shri Yantra Mandir, Haridwar)

Early life
Pujya Swami Vishwadevanand Puri was born as Kailash Nath Shukla in Naugawan Village, Kanpur District, in Uttar Pradesh on 26 January 1946 to ShriVishwanath Shukla. As a child he showed great interest in spirituality and religion. In his youth he also read many Vedic scriptures which progressively made him resolve to lead a Sanyasi's life for the welfare of mankind. When he was only sixteen, he left his house in the search of God. He did not return to his home, nor did he re-establish any contact with the family. While travelling he sought out a true Sanyasi and great saint Pujya Swami Sadananda Paramhansa in Dariya Pur village. He desired to learn sadhana satsang. There, under the guidance of Pujya Swami Sadananda he learned many types of sadhanas and became proficient in them.

Beginnings 
Swami Ji's interest in the Vedic philosophy had only grown and he became quite interested in Vedanta. In 1962 Swami Ji took the initiation ritual from Param Tapasvi Anant Shri Vibhushit Acharya Mahamandaleshwar Nirvana Pithadhishvar Swami Atulanand Ji; following this he became a Paramahamsa, the highest level of spiritual education, and is believed to make you one with "Ultimate Reality". He was thus renamed Paramahamsa Parivrajaka Acharya Swami Vishwadevanand Ji Maharaj. Pujya Maharaj then went on a pilgrimage to holy sites in various parts of India to understand the plight of people and find viable solutions for dispelling ignorance. Later, he went for a world tour to share his knowledge with people throughout the world. Supported by his Vedic knowledge and rich experiences of spirituality, he developed a broad vision to serve the society based on the greatest dictum "Vasudev Kutumbkam" meaning "the whole world is one family of the divine". That's why he is the founder of Vishwa Kalyan Foundation in Haridwar.

Education 
With the permission of Swami Aulanand Ji Maharaj, he went to study at Sannyas Ashram in Elise Bridge, Ahmedabad. While there he studied the systems of Nyaya, Bhagwat, Vedanta, as well as grammar and philosophy under the tutelage of Param Guru Acharya Mahamandaleshwar Nirvana Pithadhishvar Swami Krishnanand Ji Maharaj Shri. Following his successful completion of his studies he then went to the University of Delhi and accomplished his Masters in the English language. Ji Maharaj Shri helped Swami Vishwadevanand Ji to understand one thing fundamentally - that Vedanta is a ‘‘pramana’’: to know the truth of the Self.

Pithadhishwar of Mahanirvani Akhada

The saints of the Sanatan Dharma (Hindu Society) and a leading organization of millions of sadhus, the Shri Panchayati Akhada Mahanirvan had designated him as Prime Saint in 1985 at the Haridwar Maha Kumbh. He has then been elected as Acharya Mahamandaleshwar (the leader of all the saints of Shri Panchayati Akhada Mahanirvan). As the Acharya Mahamandaleshwar of the Akhada, Maharaj Shri is chairman of various Ashrams situated at Haridwar, Varanasi, Kolkata and Ahmedabad, etc. Maharaj Shri established the first Shri Yantra Mandir made of stone in the world. This temple is situated in Kankhal, Haridwar, Uttarakhand (Himalayas) India. His prominent disciple is Anantbodh Chaitanya from Panipat, Haryana, initiated on 13 April 2005 in Sanyas Ashram Ellisbridge, Ahmedabad. Swami  Vishwadevanand ji appointed an Australian citizen Swami Jasraj Puri as a Mahamandleshwar in Mahanirvani Akhada.

Aastha Channel has filmed a documentary about Swami Vishwadevanand ji. Swami Vishwadevanand ji has initiated thousands of Nagas of Mahanirvani Akhada being as an Acharya post. Brahamlin Swami Martand Puri ji  got Diksha from Swami Vishwadevanand Puri ji and he was appointed as a Mahamandaleshwar by Swami ji. Swami Nityanand was also appointed as a Mahamandleshwar by Swami Vishwadevanand ji 2013 Prayagraj Mahakumbh.

Works for Humankind

Pujya Maharaj Shri delivered religious discourses for the last thirty years, as a preacher of the Sanatan Dharma. In India, Pujya Maharaj Shri attracted huge audiences. His simple, scientific, and interesting presentation of the philosophy is so powerful that it has changed the lives of thousands of people. He often tours outside India as well. He has inspired thousands of people in Singapore, Malaysia and England, Canada, America where his visit is always anxiously awaited. Pujya Maharaj Shri visited the USA several times and evoked tremendous response in every city that he visited.
His lectures cover the teachings of the Vedas, Upanishads, Bhagavatam, Puranas, Bhagavad Geeta, Ramayana, and other Eastern and Western philosophies. Like the true disciple of a true master, Pujya Maharaj Shri masterfully quotes from scriptures of different religions that could satisfy even the most discerning of knowledge seekers. He also reveals the simple and straightforward way of God-realization which can be practised by anyone. Another unique feature about his lectures is that he establishes every spiritual truth through scriptural quotations, irrefutable logic, and humorous real-life illustrations. His wisdom filled anecdotes, humorous stories and clarity has the audience both enthralled and entertained for the entire duration of his lecture! Pujya Maharaj Shri's warmth and humility touch all those who have the fortune to have his association. In fact, his very presence radiates Grace and Bliss.
Pujya Maharaj Shri is a Great Philosopher – a great thinker. Science is not the end for him. Science can only create a better world bereft of poverty, illness, and unfair disparities. He thinks beyond science. He creates a world of universal oneness – integrated with religion, science, and art. He is the ‘confluence’ in which many streams converge and reflect an individual's quest for meaning. Pujya Maharaj Shri is an honourable member of the Vishva Hindu Parishad. Sangh Sanchalak Shri Sudrashan ji and Mr. Lal Krishna Advani ji visited Sannyas Ashram, Ahmedabad and meet Swami Vishwadevanand ji on the occasion of Vijayadashami (31-10-2004) to inauguration of a movie based on Dr. Hedgewar life. Swami ji fight for Ram Setu and Ram Mandir. The RSS chief Mohan Bhagwat visited to Sanyas Ashram on Ashram Road and met its head Nirvan Pithadhishwar Acharya Mahamandaleshwar Swami Vishwadevanand Maharaj. "He spent nearly 45 minutes here. We discussed about religious affairs and ancient Indian traditions and issues like terrorism.

Institutions
Educational Institutes- 
 The first College for Sanyasis was Sanyasi College, Varanasi (Uttar Pradesh). It was established in 1907. More than 1000 Sanyasis have been passed out from this college. The founder of this college was Brahmlin Nirvana Pithadhishwar Acharya Mahamandleshwar Shri 108 Swami Jayendra Puri ji Maharaj. More than 300 books have been published from here since 1907.
 Shri Kashi Vishwanath Sanskrit Mahavidyalaya, Ahmedabad, Gujarat. It is in the Elis Bridge area on the bank of the river Sabarmati. It was also established by Brahmin Nirvana Pithadhishvar Acharya Mahamandleshwar Shri 108 Swami Shri Jayendra Puri Ji in 1933.

Temple and Sharda Ghat
There is a well-known Shri Yantra Mandir in this Ashram. The ashram has other Temples also around the Shree Yantra Mandir on the banks of the holy river Ganga where daily morning prayers are performed followed by Yagna, the fire ritual. We also do an evening Aarti. Special Pujas, such as Rudrabhishek and Ganga Puja, are conducted from time to time. The Temple houses a Shiva lingam, along with altars to Ganesha, Parvati, Lord Narayan with Laxmi, Surya Narayan (the Sun God), and Hanuman. Astha Channel Shows about temple in Swamiji documentary.

Contributions to Global Spiritual Harmony
Pujya Maharaj Shri was a consistent and steadfast proponent of true freedom of religious pursuit. In his words, "The freedom to practice one’s religion is not negotiable." According to him, religious freedom includes not just the right to choose, practice and propagate one's religion, but the important right to have those freedoms protected from an unsolicited attempt, and especially, a coercive attempt, to supplant one's religion. He describes the religious choice to be complete freedom of letting all religions and correspondingly, the religious and spiritual pursuits of the people who are the followers of each one of these religions, coexist. He emphasizes that important message with a degree of clarity that is powerful enough to ward off religious conflicts and promote religious harmony. He advocated that "religious harmony is closely dependent on the freedom each religion grants to the other."

Death
Pujya Maharaj Ji took samadhi in Haridwar on 7 May 2013. His car got an accident while he was returning to his Ashram from Jolly Grant Airport, Dehradun.

References

External links
Nirvan Pithadhishwar Acharya Mahamandleshwar Swami Vishwadevanand Puri
स्वामी विश्वदेवानंद जी को दी गयी भू समाधि 
स्वामी विश्वदेवानंद जी को श्रद्धांजलि 

Indian Hindu monks
Hindu tantra
1946 births
2013 deaths
People from Kanpur Nagar district